Dharamvir Singh Tyagi (1935–2006) was an Indian politician who was a member of the 8th Lok Sabha from 1984 to 1989.

References

1935 births
2006 deaths
India MPs 1984–1989
Indian National Congress politicians
Lok Sabha members from Uttar Pradesh
Uttar Pradesh MLAs 1969–1974
Uttar Pradesh MLAs 1980–1985
People from Muzaffarnagar
Indian National Congress politicians from Uttar Pradesh